Kozakia baliensis is a species of acetic acid bacteria, with type strain Yo-3T (= NRIC 0488T = JCM 11301T = IFO 16664T = DSM 14400T). It is the type species of its genus.

References

Further reading
Phuangnui, Jirarat, et al. "Kozakia baliensis, THE NEW POTENTIAL ACITIC ACID BACTERIUM USES FOR DIHYDROXYACETONE PRODUCTION."
Dworkin, Martin, and Stanley Falkow, eds. The Prokaryotes: Vol. 5. Springer, 2006.
Sjamsuridzal, Wellyzar. Forkomikro Catalogue of Cultures of Indonesian Microorganisms. Yayasan Obor Indonesia, 2008.

External links

LPSN
Type strain of Kozakia baliensis at BacDive -  the Bacterial Diversity Metadatabase

Gram-negative bacteria
Rhodospirillales
Bacteria described in 2002